Vasily Zakharov (born 1934) is a Soviet and Russian economist who served as the minister of culture between 1986 and 1989 in the Soviet Union. He was a member of central committee of the Communist Party.

Biography
Zakharov was born in 1934. He is a graduate of Leningrad State University where he received a PhD in economics in 1957. He later became a full professor. He taught at the Tomsk Polytechnic Institute and Leningrad Technological Institute.  

Zakharov's career at the Communist Party began in 1973 when he was named as the head of the propaganda and agitation department in Leningrad. He moved to Moscow in 1983 because of his appointment as first deputy chief of the propaganda department of the party's central committee. From January 1986 he worked as the second secretary of the Moscow City central committee under Boris Yeltsin. In March 1986 Zakharov became one of the central committee members of the Communist Party. On 17 August 1986 he was named the minister of culture, replacing Pyotr Demichev in the post. In June 1989 Zakharov was again proposed by Soviet Premier Nikolai Ryzhkov as minister of culture. However, he and other five nominees were rejected by the Supreme Soviet in July 1989.

References

External links

20th-century Russian economists
21st-century Russian economists
1934 births
Living people
Central Committee of the Communist Party of the Soviet Union members
Culture ministers of the Soviet Union
Academic staff of the Saint Petersburg State Institute of Technology
Saint Petersburg State University alumni
Members of the Supreme Soviet of the Russian Soviet Federative Socialist Republic, 1980–1985
Members of the Supreme Soviet of the Russian Soviet Federative Socialist Republic, 1985–1990
Recipients of the Order of Friendship of Peoples
Recipients of the Order of the Red Banner of Labour
Soviet economists